As time passed, more Winston Cup races ended up on TV. ESPN broadcast its first race in 1981, from North Carolina Motor Speedway (its first live race was later in the year at Atlanta International Raceway), and TNN followed in 1991.  All Cup races were nationally televised by 1985; networks struck individual deals with track owners, and multiple channels carried racing action. Many races were shown taped and edited on Wide World of Sports and syndication services like Mizlou and SETN, but almost all races were live by 1989.  By 2000, the last year of this arrangement, six networks televised at least one Cup series race: CBS, ABC, ESPN, TNN, TBS, and NBC.

Also, a growing number of races in the Busch Grand National Series and Craftsman Truck Series were made available for broadcast, and some track owners even threw in support races in lesser series. Likewise, Winston Cup qualifying aired on ESPN2 or regional sports network Prime Network.

NASCAR wanted to capitalize on its increased popularity even more, so they decided that future deals would be centralized; that is, the networks would negotiate directly with NASCAR for a regular schedule of telecasts.

List of races televised

1990

After years of trying to win it, Dale Earnhardt appeared headed for certain victory in the 1990 Daytona 500 until a series of events in the closing laps. On lap 193, Geoff Bodine spun in the first turn, causing the third and final caution of the race. Everyone pitted except Derrike Cope, who stayed out. On the lap 195 restart, Earnhardt retook and held the lead, only to puncture a tire when he drove over a piece of metal bell housing from the failed engine of Rick Wilson's car on Lap 199. As Earnhardt's damaged car slowed, Cope drove past and earned his first Cup Series victory. It was the first of two victories for the relatively unknown Cope in the 1990 season. In an ironic twist, KIRO-TV, the local CBS affiliate serving Cope's hometown at the time in the Seattle suburb of Spanaway, opted to pre-empt the race to telecast a Seattle SuperSonics basketball game, and the race was delayed until 3:00 p.m. Pacific Time because of the pre-emption.

SportsChannel America's coverage began in 1990. For instance, SportsChannel America broadcast the Roses Stores 200 and the Chevy Dealers of New England 250.

TBS broadcast the Richmond spring race, held the week after Daytona Speedweeks, from 1983 to 1995, as well as the fall races at Rockingham (1985-1987), Atlanta (1983-1985) and Riverside (1982-1987). For several years in the 1990s, the only Cup Series races aired on TBS were the two races from Charlotte Motor Speedway (Coca-Cola 600 from 1988-2000, UAW-GM Quality 500 from 1989-2000); TBS did not have rights to The Winston, which usually aired on TNN. Also, the channel aired the July race at Pocono Raceway from 1993 to 2000. TBS was also the home of the postseason exhibition races held at Suzuka Circuit and Twin Ring Motegi in Japan from 1996–1998. The now defunct Prime Network meanwhile, was the first to televise NASCAR Winston Cup qualifying races on a regular basis. The telecasts were mainly for races that would be televised by TBS.

After SETN folded, one Pocono race a year was produced by Jim Wiglesworth on pay-per-view for Viewer's Choice (now In Demand) from 1988 to 1990. They were not a huge success, as fans were reluctant to pay for what they could see last week for free. The Viewer's Choice shows were noteworthy in that they premiered viewer phone-in questions during the races.

1991
 

TNN started showing races live in 1991, but it had aired taped coverage of a few Winston Cup races in the 1980s on its American Sports Cavalcade program. TNN had a self-operating and self-promoting sub-division called TNN Motor Sports, and aired races produced by that division from 1991 to 2000. Under the TNN Motor Sports umbrella, NASCAR series races (including those of the then-Winston Cup Series and Busch Grand National Series, as well as the Craftsman Truck Series) were the most prominently featured, but races of smaller circuits such as the International Motor Sports Association IMSA Sports Car Series, ASA, USAC, the NHRA, and ARCA were also showcased, as was motorcycle and speedboat racing. TNN picked up several of the "second tier" Winston Cup races of the time, whose rights packages were allowed to expire by ESPN. Races at tracks such as Rockingham, Dover, Pocono, Loudon, and Phoenix, were among the events signed. In general, ESPN abandoned slower, longer, races which used large broadcast windows. 500-mile races at Rockingham, Dover and Pocono were known to last upwards of five hours, requiring a broadcast window as long as six hours (to include pre-race and post-race coverage). The races at Rockingham and Dover were shortened to 400 miles in 1995 and 1997, respectively, but remained part of the TNN lineup. TNN's relatively open schedule for Sunday afternoons allowed large NASCAR broadcast windows. TNN also picked up rights to The Winston when it was moved to prime time.

1992
 

For one year, Daytona 500 pole qualifying and the Busch Clash swapped days: the Busch Clash was held on Saturday, and qualifying was held Sunday. This move was made at the request of CBS, who wanted the additional time on Sunday for its coverage of the 1992 Winter Olympics. The network had aired the Busch Clash since it began in 1979. The race debuted on a Sunday, which CBS broadcast live. Pole position qualifying for the Daytona 500 would start Sunday at 10:00 a.m., followed by the Daytona ARCA 200. The Busch Clash would be held after the ARCA race at 3:00 p.m.

1993

Notes
1- ABC was originally scheduled to televise this race on 3/14, but the Storm of the Century had it postponed a week. ABC bailed out, so a frozen TNN crew stepped in to show the race; in trade they gave up the Busch Series race they were going to show on that weekend to ESPN. 
 
2- Bonnett drove in this race, making his first start since his sidling crash at Darlington in March of 1990. He crashed in spectacular fashion and joined Squier and Jarrett for the finish of the race.

1994

The 1994 Brickyard 400 broadcast was billed as "A Special Presentation of ABC Sports," and technically did not fall under the moniker of Wide World of Sports. Starting with the  1995 Indianapolis 500, ABC Sports started billing their races at Indy under the WWOS banner (that is, of course, not including 1965-1970). The 1995 BY400 shifted to tape delay on ESPN, so the first BY400 to be a WWOS presentation would be the 1996 race. That means that the "first...since" NASCAR race to be a WWOS presentation might have been the 1995 or 1996 spring race at Atlanta (Purolator 500). It is also worth noting that the first permanent "score bug" used on ABC for perhaps ANY sport broadcast was during the 1994 Purolator 500 (spring race) at Atlanta. It was a transparent digit counting down the number of laps left in the race. It was used 2 months later during the Indianapolis 500 (with a different font), then again at the 1994 BY400. 
In 1994, the Brickyard 400 was shown on same-day tape delay on WRTV instead of live. In 1995 (due to the rain delay), it was shown on same-day tape delay on WRTV, while the rest of the country had to wait until Sunday afternoon. From 1996-2000, it was on same-day tape delay on WRTV. When BY400 switched to NBC for 2001, WTHR-13 (by 2005) ditched the blackout, and reverted to a live broadcast. Once it moved to ESPN in 2007, it has not been blacked out locally.

The Winter Heat Series, aired during the winter months between November and January (during NASCAR's offseason). The program began during the 1994-1995 winter and ran through the 1998-1999 winter. The races were held at the 3/8 mile Tucson Raceway Park in Tucson, Arizona. TNN originally broadcast the races before ESPN took over.

1995

Speedvision launched on December 31, 1995. It was founded by Roger L. Werner, E. Roger Williams, Nickolas Rhodes, and Robert Scanlon; the network's original ownership included cable providers Cox Communications and Continental Cablevision, and AT&T Corporation. Speedvision's initial lineup featured various automotive programs, including various documentary-style series focusing on prolific vehicles, manufacturers, and racing teams (such as Victory by Design and Legends of Motorsport), series focusing on classic automobiles (such as Dream Car Garage, coverage of Barrett-Jackson's auctions, and My Classic Car, which moved to the network from TNN), an AutoWeek-branded television series, along with MotorWeek and Autoline Detroit – two programs respectively syndicated from PBS member stations in Maryland and Detroit. Speedvision also carried coverage of various minor and professional auto racing series, including the Sports Car Club of America's World Challenge series (of which it also acquired title sponsorship of in 1999, becoming the Speedvision World Challenge).

Notes
1- For the Pepsi 400 and Southern 500, ESPN ran what was a bit of prelude to DirecTV's Hotpass. ESPN showed the race, while ESPN2 showed onboard cameras and radio with some of the teams. It did not work out to ESPN's liking and was dropped after that. 
 
2- After being delayed all day due to rain, the race was about to start, but ABC decided to bail out; ESPN showed the race the next day.

1996

 
Dale Earnhardt took a horrifying tumble down the front straightaway in "The Big One," after Ernie Irvan got into the side of Sterling Marlin which caused him to hit Earnhardt. After he hit the wall hard, Earnhardt was hit by multiple cars upside down and on the car's side. He ended up breaking his collarbone, and this helped begin a winless streak that spanned the rest of the 1996 season and all of the 1997 season. The race was cut short due to the wreck, and a rainstorm earlier in the race added the factor of darkness, with Jeff Gordon winning. These events helped push the DieHard 500 from the heat, humidity, and almost commonly occurring afternoon thunderstorms of late July to a much cooler, and in the case of the weather, more stable early October date. This was the last Cup race to not be televised live because of the rain delay; the broadcast of the race aired one week later, as an abridged broadcast on CBS.

Notes
1- Due to the race being delayed by rain, CBS went to golf and showed the race on 8/4.

1997

1998
 

In 1998, a CBS-televised race at Pikes Peak International Raceway in Fountain, Colorado, scheduled for 186 laps ran 12 extra laps (totaling 198) because of multiple attempts at a successful Green-White-Checkered Finish.

In 1998, TNN acquired the one-time rights (from CBS) of the Pepsi 400. Due to wildfires, the race was postponed from July 4 to October.

1999

20 years after its Daytona 500 broadcast, CBS used at least 200 people and more than 80 cameras for their coverage:
 33 in-car cameras - three cameras in 11 different cars.
 10 "pole" cameras above the pits.
 35 cameras around the track.
 A camera in a blimp.
 A camera with each of the three pit reporters.
 A camera in the booth.

CBS also planned to use more computerized graphics and a super slow-motion camera with a long lens.

Prior to the original 1999 contract between NASCAR and NBC, the network aired races such as the National 500 at Charlotte Motor Speedway from 1979 to 1981, the 1981 Mountain Dew 500 at Pocono International Raceway, the Winston 500 at Alabama International Motor Speedway from 1983 to 1985, and the Miami 300 and Pennzoil 400 at Homestead-Miami Speedway in both 1999 and 2000.

See also
List of Daytona 500 broadcasters
List of Wide World of Sports (American TV series) announcers
List of events broadcast on Wide World of Sports (American TV series)
NASCAR on television in the 1960s
NASCAR on television in the 1970s
NASCAR on television in the 1980s
NASCAR on television in the 2000s
NASCAR on television in the 2010s

References

1990s
CBS Sports
NBC Sports
ESPN
ESPN2
ABC Sports
Wide World of Sports (American TV series)
Turner Sports
Prime Sports
Speed (TV network)
Spike (TV network)
SportsChannel
 
 
 
 
 
 
 
 
 
 
1990s in American television